Karoran is a census town in Rupnagar district in the Indian state of Punjab.

Demographics
 India census, Karoran had a population of 20,351. Males constitute 56% of the population and females 44%. Karoran has an average literacy rate of 65%, higher than the national average of 59.5%: male literacy is 73%, and female literacy is 56%. In Karoran, 15% of the population is under 6 years of age.

References

Cities and towns in Sahibzada Ajit Singh Nagar district